SMS Schleswig-Holstein was the last of the five pre-dreadnought s built by the German Kaiserliche Marine. The ship, named for the province of Schleswig-Holstein, was laid down in the Germaniawerft dockyard in Kiel in August 1905 and commissioned into the fleet nearly three years later. The ships of her class were already outdated by the time they entered service, being inferior in size, armor, firepower and speed to the new generation of dreadnought battleships.

Schleswig-Holstein fought in both World Wars. During World War I, she saw front-line service in II Battle Squadron of the High Seas Fleet, culminating in the Battle of Jutland on 31 May – 1 June 1916. Schleswig-Holstein saw action during the engagement, and was hit by one large-caliber shell. After the battle, Schleswig-Holstein was relegated to guard duty in the mouth of the Elbe River before being decommissioned in late 1917. As one of the few battleships permitted for Germany by the terms of the Treaty of Versailles, Schleswig-Holstein was again pressed into fleet service in the 1920s. In 1935, the old battleship was converted into a training ship for naval cadets.

Schleswig-Holstein fired the first shots of World War II when she bombarded the Polish base at Danzig's Westerplatte in the early morning hours of 1 September 1939. The ship was used as a training vessel for the majority of the war, and was sunk by British bombers in Gotenhafen in December 1944. Schleswig-Holstein was subsequently salvaged and then beached for use by the Soviet Navy as a target. As of 1990, the ship's bell was on display in the Bundeswehr Military History Museum in Dresden.

Design 

The passage of the Second Naval Law in 1900 under the direction of Vizeadmiral (VAdmVice Admiral) Alfred von Tirpitz secured funding for the construction of twenty new battleships over the next seventeen years. The Deutschland-class ships were broadly similar to the Braunschweigs and featured incremental improvements in armor protection. They also abandoned the gun turrets for the secondary battery guns, moving them back to traditional casemates to save weight. The British battleship armed with ten 12-inch (30.5 cm) gunswas commissioned in December 1906. Dreadnoughts revolutionary design rendered obsolete every capital ship of the German navy, including Schleswig-Holstein.

In addition to being the fastest ship of her class, Schleswig-Holstein was the second-most fuel efficient. She had a standard crew of 35 officers and 708 enlisted men.

The ship's primary armament consisted of four 28 cm SK L/40 guns in two twin turrets; one turret was placed forward and the other aft. Her offensive armament was rounded out with a secondary battery of fourteen  SK L/40 guns mounted individually in casemates. A battery of twenty-two  SK L/45 guns in single mounts provided defense against torpedo boats. The ship was also armed with six  torpedo tubes, all below the waterline. One was in the bow, one in the stern, and four on the broadside.

Service history 
Schleswig-Holstein was laid down on 18 August 1905 at the Germaniawerft dockyard in Kiel. She was launched on 17 December 1906, the last pre-dreadnought battleship of the German navy. At Schleswig-Holsteins launching ceremony, she was christened by Augusta Victoria of Schleswig-Holstein, the German Empress; Wilhelm II was also in attendance. Ernst Gunther, the Duke of Schleswig-Holstein, gave the commissioning speech.

Upon completion, Schleswig-Holstein was commissioned for sea trials on 6 July 1908. Her crew largely came from her sister ship . On 21 September the ship was assigned to II Battle Squadron of the High Seas Fleet, alongside her sister ships. In November, fleet and unit exercises were conducted in the Baltic Sea. The training regimen in which Schleswig-Holstein participated followed a similar pattern over the next five years. Fleet maneuvers were conducted in the spring, followed by a summer cruise to Norway, and additional fleet training in the fall. This included another cruise into the Atlantic, from 7 July to 1 August 1909.

Starting in September 1910, Friedrich Boedicker took command of the ship, a position he held for the next three years. On 3 October 1911, the ship was transferred back to II Squadron. Due to the Agadir Crisis in July, the summer cruise only went into the Baltic. In 1913, she won the Kaiser's Schiesspreis (Gunnery Award). On 14 July 1914, the annual summer cruise to Norway began, but the threat of war in Europe cut the excursion short; within two weeks Schleswig-Holstein and the rest of II Squadron had returned to Wilhelmshaven.

World War I 
At the outbreak of war in July 1914, Schleswig-Holstein was assigned to guard duty in the mouth of the Elbe River while the rest of the fleet mobilized. In late October, she and her sisters were sent to Kiel to have improvements made to their underwater protection system to make them more resistant to torpedoes and mines, after which II Battle Squadron rejoined the fleet. The squadron covered Rear Admiral Franz von Hipper's battlecruisers of the I Scouting Group while they bombarded Scarborough, Hartlepool, and Whitby on 15–16 December 1914. During the operation, the German battle fleet of some 12 dreadnoughts and 8 pre-dreadnoughts came to within  of an isolated squadron of six British battleships. However, skirmishes between the rival destroyer screens convinced the German commander, Admiral Friedrich von Ingenohl, that he was confronted with the entire Grand Fleet, and so he broke off the engagement and turned the fleet for home. In April 1916, the ship had two of her 8.8 cm guns removed and replaced with 8.8 cm Flak guns.

Schleswig-Holstein then participated in a fleet advance to the Dogger Bank on 21–22 April 1915. On 11–12 September II Reconnaissance Group conducted a minelaying operation off the Swarte Bank with II Squadron in support. This was followed by another sweep by the fleet on 23–24 October that ended without result. II and III Battle Squadron dreadnoughts conducted an advance into the North Sea on 5–7 March 1916; Schleswig-Holstein and the rest of II Squadron remained in the German Bight, ready to sail in support. They then rejoined the fleet during the operation to bombard Yarmouth and Lowestoft on 24–25 April. During this operation, the battlecruiser  was damaged by a British mine and had to return to port prematurely. Visibility was poor, so the operation was quickly called off before the British fleet could intervene.

Battle of Jutland 

The commander of the High Seas Fleet, Admiral Reinhard Scheer, immediately planned another advance into the North Sea, but the damage to Seydlitz delayed the operation until the end of May. As the last ship assigned to IV Division of II Battle Squadron, the rearmost German formation, Schleswig-Holstein was the last battleship in the line. II Battle Squadron was commanded by Rear Admiral . During the "Run to the North", Scheer ordered the fleet to pursue the retreating battleships of the British 5th Battle Squadron at top speed. Schleswig-Holstein and her sisters were  significantly slower than the dreadnoughts and quickly fell behind. During this period, Admiral Scheer directed  to place herself behind Schleswig-Holstein so he would have a flagship on either end of the formation. By 19:30, the Grand Fleet had arrived on the scene and confronted Admiral Scheer with significant numerical superiority. The German fleet was severely hampered by the presence of the slower Deutschland-class ships; if Scheer had ordered an immediate turn towards Germany, he would have had to sacrifice the slower ships to make his escape.

Admiral Scheer decided to reverse the course of the fleet with the Gefechtskehrtwendung, a maneuver that required every unit in the German line to turn 180° simultaneously.  Having fallen behind, the ships of II Battle Squadron could not conform to the new course following the turn, and fell to the disengaged side of the German line. Admiral Mauve considered moving his ships to the rear of the line, astern of III Battle Squadron dreadnoughts, but decided against it when he realized the movement would interfere with the maneuvering of Hipper's battlecruisers. Instead, he attempted to place his ships at the head of the line. But by the time II Squadron reached its position at the head of the line, Scheer had ordered another Gefechtskehrtwendung, which placed them at the rear of the German fleet. By 21:00, Scheer had turned the fleet around a third time, but the slow speed of Schleswig-Holstein and her squadron mates caused them to fall out of position, to the disengaged side of the fleet.

Later on the first day of the battle, Hipper's badly damaged battlecruisers were being engaged by their British rivals. Schleswig-Holstein and the other so-called "five-minute ships" came to their aid by steaming in between the opposing battlecruiser squadrons. These ships were very briefly engaged, owing in large part to the poor visibility. The visibility was so bad, the gunners aboard Schleswig-Holstein could not make out a target, and she did not fire her main guns. At 21:35 a heavy caliber shell struck the ship on the port-side, punching a hole approximately 40 cm (16 in) wide before exploding against the inner casemate armor. It tore apart  of the superstructure deck and disabled one of the port side casemate guns. Three men were killed and nine were wounded. Admiral Mauve halted the fight against the much more powerful battlecruisers and ordered an 8-point turn to starboard.

Around 03:00, British destroyers conducted a series of attacks against the fleet, some of which were directed towards Schleswig-Holstein. Shortly thereafter, Pommern was struck by at least one torpedo from the destroyer ; the hit detonated an ammunition magazine, destroying the ship in a tremendous explosion. During the attack, Schleswig-Holstein was forced to turn away to avoid the destroyers' torpedoes. Shortly after 05:00, Hannover and several other ships fired repeatedly at what they falsely believed to be British submarines.

Despite the ferocity of the night fighting, the High Seas Fleet punched through the British destroyer forces and reached Horns Reef by 4:00 on 1 June. Over the course of the battle, Schleswig-Holstein had fired only twenty 17 cm rounds.

Later actions 
Schleswig-Holstein was put into dock for repairs 10–25 June 1916. The Navy then decided to withdraw the four remaining Deutschland-class ships, owing to their obsolescence and vulnerability to underwater attacks, as demonstrated by the loss of Pommern. Thereafter, the ship was used as a target for U-boats, except during 12–23 February 1917 when she was used as a guard ship. In April Schleswig-Holstein was sent to Altenbruch at the mouth of the Elbe; here she was decommissioned on 2 May. Schleswig-Holstein was then disarmed and assigned to the 5th U-boat Flotilla to be used as a barracks ship in Bremerhaven. In 1918 the ship was moved to Kiel, where she remained for the rest of the war.

Inter-war years 

Following the German defeat in World War I, the German navy was reorganized as the Reichsmarine according to the Treaty of Versailles. The new navy was permitted to retain eight pre-dreadnought battleships under Article 181—two of which would be in reserve—for coastal defense. Schleswig-Holstein was among the ships that were retained, along with her sisters Hannover and Schlesien and several of the Braunschweig-class battleships. Schleswig-Holstein was recommissioned as the new fleet flagship on 31 January 1926 following an extensive refit, with new fire controls and an enlarged aft superstructure for the admiral's staff. The secondary 17 cm guns were replaced with  pieces and four 50 cm torpedo tubes were fitted in main deck casemates fore and aft, replacing the submerged tubes.

Schleswig-Holstein and her sister Hannover went on a training cruise into the Atlantic that lasted from 14 May to 17 June 1926; while on the cruise, she visited Palma de Mallorca in the Mediterranean from 22 to 30 May. There, the chief of the fleet, Vice Admiral Konrad Mommsen, met with King Alfonso XIII. Schleswig-Holstein went on another training cruise between 30 March and 14 June 1927 into the Atlantic. She visited a series of Iberian ports, including Lisbon, Portugal, where Mommsen was greeted by Óscar Carmona, the president of Portugal. In December 1927 Schleswig-Holstein went back into dock, re-emerging in January 1928 with her forefunnel trunked back into the second and both remaining funnels heightened, as had previously been done with her sister Schlesien.

With the delivery of the new  Panzerschiffe (armored ships) beginning in 1933, the older battleships were gradually withdrawn from front-line service. In May 1935, the Reichsmarine was reorganized as the Kriegsmarine by the reforms instituted by Adolf Hitler that created the Wehrmacht. Schleswig-Holstein ceased to be fleet flagship on 22 September 1935, and was refitted as a cadet training ship during January–March and May–July 1936. The changes included removing her remaining upper deck 15 cm guns and her torpedo tubes, and her two aft boiler rooms were converted to oil-firing models, although the forward boilers remained coal-fired. The ship's standard complement was also reduced from 35 officers and 708 enlisted men to 31 officers and 565 sailors. The crew was supplemented by 175 cadets, who were taken on long cruises in Schlesien and Schleswig-Holstein, the latter sailing in October 1936 on a six-month voyage to South America and the Caribbean. The following year, her cruise took her around Africa, and the 1938–1939 cruise went back to South American and Caribbean waters. Gustav Kieseritzky served as the ship's commander from June 1938 until April 1939.

In the mid-1930s, Hitler began pursuing an increasingly aggressive foreign policy; in 1936 he re-militarized the Rhineland, and in 1938 completed the Anschluss of Austria and the annexation of the Sudetenland. He then demanded German control over the city of Danzig, which had become a free city after World War I.

World War II 

Early on 1 September 1939, Germany launched an invasion of Poland. Schleswig-Holstein had been positioned in the port of Danzig, moored close to the Polish ammunition depot at Westerplatte under the guise of a ceremonial visit in August. Around 04:47 on 1 September, Schleswig-Holstein opened fire with her main battery at the Polish positions on the Westerplatte, and in doing so fired the first shots of World War II. These shots were the signal for ground troops to begin their assault on the installation, though the first German ground attack in the Battle of Westerplatte was repelled shortly thereafter. A second assault began later that morning, again supported by Schleswig-Holstein, though it too had failed to break into the installation by around noon.

Schleswig-Holstein was joined on 4 September by the torpedo boats T196 and Von der Gröben. A force of German infantry and army engineers went ashore to take the depot, with heavy fire support from Schleswig-Holstein. The Poles managed to hold off the Germans until they were forced to surrender on 7 September at 10:30. Following the Polish surrender, Schleswig-Holstein began shelling Polish positions at Hel and Redłowo; these operations lasted until 13 September. Between 25 and 27 September, the old battleship returned to Hel with her sister Schlesien; both vessels conducted further bombardments of Polish positions there. On 25 September the Schleswig-Holstein was lightly damaged by Polish coastal batteries at Hel.

The German military then turned its attention westward, and in April 1940 invaded Denmark. Schleswig-Holstein was assigned to Gruppe 7, a part of the naval component for the German invasion force for Denmark. Along with the torpedo boat Claus von Bevern and several auxiliary ships, her objective was to support the capture of Korsør and Nyborg. During the invasion, the ship was briefly grounded in the Great Belt, west of Agersø. Following the operation, she was transferred back to training duties, as the flagship of the Chief of Training Units. At the end of 1943, the reactivation of Schleswig-Holstein was once again contemplated. In her favor was the fact that she retained some coal-fired boilers, given the ever-worsening oil-supply situation. Thus, on 1 February 1944 she was once again recommissioned, at first taking up her old role as a cadet training ship, then later in the year docking at Gotenhafen (Gdynia) for a refit. She was to be converted into a convoy escort ship with a greatly enhanced anti-aircraft armament, but after being hit three times by Royal Air Force bombers on 18 December 1944, she eventually foundered in shallow water. As the ship was permanently disabled, her crew was sent ashore to assist in the defense of Marienburg.

Following the Soviet capture of that city, the remaining crew detonated scuttling charges in the wreck on 21 March to further destroy the ship. After the war, the ship was raised during 1945–1946 by the Soviet Navy and transferred to Tallinn. Although reference books long stated that she was scrapped there or in Marienburg, in actuality she was towed out in 1948 and beached for long-term use as a target in shallow water off the island of Osmussaar in the Gulf of Finland. Last used for target practice around 1966, the remains are now submerged. Her bell was held in the collection of the Military History Museum of the Bundeswehr in Dresden as of 1990.

Footnotes

Notes

Citations

References

Further reading 

 
 
 
 

Deutschland-class battleships
Ships built in Kiel
1906 ships
World War I battleships of Germany
Battleships of the Kriegsmarine
World War II battleships of Germany
Ships sunk by British aircraft
Shipwrecks in the Baltic Sea
Maritime incidents in December 1944
Maritime incidents in 1948